Home Sweet Homicide is an American mystery film directed by Lloyd Bacon and released in 1946. It stars Peggy Ann Garner, Randolph Scott and Lynn Bari, and was based on the eponymous mystery novel by Craig Rice.

The film features the line "The Gat had gittens," referring to a handgun or machine pistol having been fired, as well as other slang terms for guns, such as "heater", "rod," and "piece."

Though he would make 39 more films, Home Sweet Homicide is the second-to-last non-western film of Randolph Scott's career.

Plot
When gunshots are heard next door, the three children of widowed mystery novelist Marian Carstairs try to help the police help their mother solve the case or solve it themselves.

Polly Walker, an actress, runs from the neighbors' house, telling police lieutenant Bill Smith that she had gone there to see Flora Sanford and found her dead. Flora was an agent who represented Polly as well as Marian, whose books feature a detective character with the same name as Bill's.

Various suspects are considered, including other neighbors and Flora's hiding husband, who had fallen in love with Polly and wanted a divorce. The children begin sending anonymous letters, believing they are helping the investigation, until Bill finally persuades them to let him handle the case. He solves it, then expresses a romantic interest in Marian, pleasing the kids.

Cast
 Randolph Scott as Lt. Smith
 Peggy Ann Garner as Dinah
 Lynn Bari as Marian
 Dean Stockwell as Archie
 Connie Marshall as April
 Stanley Logan as Cherrington
 Anabel Shaw as Polly
 Barbara Whiting as Jo-Ella Holbrook
 James Gleason as Sgt. O'Hare
 Sheppard Strudwick as Wallace Sanford

References

External links

 

1946 films
20th Century Fox films
American mystery films
American black-and-white films
Films directed by Lloyd Bacon
1946 mystery films
Films based on American novels
Films based on works by Craig Rice
Films scored by David Buttolph
1940s English-language films
1940s American films